Ewald Balser (5 October 1898 – 17 April 1978) was a German film actor. He appeared in more than 50 films between 1935 and 1975. He was born in Elberfeld, Germany and died in Vienna, Austria.

Partial filmography

 Jana, the Girl from the Bohemian Forest (1935) - Peter
 The Woman at the Crossroads (1938) - Prof. Henrici
 Detours to Happiness (1939) - Thomas Bracht
 Die unheimlichen Wünsche (1939) - Pertignac, Kunsthändler, Rafaéls Freund
 Liberated Hands (1939) - Professor Wolfram
 Der Weg zu Isabel (1940) - Manfred Corner
 The Masked Lover (1940)
 The Girl from Barnhelm (1940) - Major von Telheim
 Ehe man Ehemann wird (1941) - Prof. Hellwig
 Rembrandt (1942) - Rembrandt
 Der dunkle Tag (1943) - Wolf Burkhardt
 Ein glücklicher Mensch (1943) - Professor Lorenz
 Gabriele Dambrone (1943) - Georg Hollberg
 Der Scheiterhaufen (1945) - Amtsricher Dr. Martin
 Glaube an mich (1946) - Prof. Franz Wiesinger
 The Trial (1948) - Dr. Eötvös
 Eroica (1949) - Ludwig van Beethoven
 The Lie (1950) - Dr. Thomas Robertsen, Susannes Mann
 Furioso (1950) - Professor Soldin
 Der Wallnerbub (1950) - Pfarrer
 Das gestohlene Jahr (1951) - Dirigent Olav Svendström
 Sensation in San Remo (1951) - Prof. Feldmann
 Don't Ask My Heart (1952) - Gerichts-Vorsitzender
 Sauerbruch – Das war mein Leben (1954) - Dr.Ferdinand Sauerbruch
 Children, Mother, and the General (1955) - General
 Espionage (1955) - Oberst Redl
 The Doctor's Secret (1955) - Prof. Stephan Wendlandt
 Sarajevo (1955) - Erzherzog Franz Ferdinand
 Goetz von Berlichingen (1955) - Götz von Berlichingen
 Versuchung (1955) - Prof. Marko Brand
 Wilhelm Tell (1956) - Wilhelm Tell
  (1957) - Prof. Wilhelm Keller
 Night Nurse Ingeborg (1958) - Prof. Burger
 The Green Devils of Monte Cassino (1958) - Lt. Col. Julius Schlegel
 It Happened in Broad Daylight (1958) - Professor Manz
  (1958) - Iwan Iwanowitsch
  (1958)
 Ohne Mutter geht es nicht (1958) - Prof. Wilhelm Keller
 The House of Three Girls (1958) - Ludwig van Beethoven
 The Priest and the Girl (1958) - Bischof
  (1959) - Prof. Lund
 Glocken läuten überall (1960) - Bischof
 Don Carlos (1960) - Philipp II.
 The Cry of the Wild Geese (1961) - Caleb Gare
 Jedermann (1961) - Die Stimme des Herrn
  (1963, TV film) - Oberst Brunnthaler

References

External links

 

1898 births
1978 deaths
German male film actors
Austrian male film actors
People from Hernals
People from Elberfeld
Austrian people of German descent
20th-century German male actors
20th-century Austrian male actors
Actors from Wuppertal